Aucasaurus is a genus of medium-sized abelisaurid theropod dinosaur from Argentina that lived during the Late Cretaceous (Santonian to Campanian stage) of the Anacleto Formation. It was smaller than the related Carnotaurus, although more derived in some ways, such as its extremely reduced arms and almost total lack of fingers.
The type skeleton is complete to the thirteenth caudal vertebra, and so is relatively well understood, and is the most complete abelisaurid yet described. However, the skull is damaged, causing some paleontologists to speculate that it was involved in a fight prior to death.

In 2009, Novas suggested that Aucasaurus garridoi might be a junior synonym of Abelisaurus comahuensis. In 2010, Gregory S. Paul renamed Aucasaurus garridoi into Abelisaurus garridoi. Despite their similarities, other researchers have placed both genera as separate taxa.

Discovery 
Aucasaurus is known from finds in the Río Colorado Subgroup, a Late Cretaceous group comprising the Anacleto Formation in the Neuquén Basin of Argentina that has yielded many dinosaur fossils. Numerous sauropod eggs are also known from this deposit.

Description 

Its skull was not as short or as deep-snouted as that of Carnotaurus. Also, instead of horns, it had a pair of low ridges above each eye.

Forelimbs and hands 
The small arms of Aucasaurus were also like that of its horned relative, but were proportionally longer due to its small size, and the bones lacked the bony processes and some unusual proportions present in Carnotaurus. The hand of Aucasaurus was unusual: four metacarpals were present, but the first and fourth lacked fingers. The second and third had fingers, but they were quite short and had no claws.

Braincase 

A study was done on the braincase of Aucasaurus in 2015 by Ariana Paulina-Carabajal and Cecilia Succar, in which the skull material was scanned using a medical CT machine. Virtual three-dimensional inner ear and cranial endocasts were obtained and visualized using the imagine software at the University of Alberta. A latex cranial endocast was also made.  The forebrain, midbrain, and  hindbrain  resemble  the  morphology  described  for  the  abelisaurids Majungasaurus and Indosaurus. However, Aucasaurus exhibits a floccular process that is relatively larger than that of Majungasaurus. In Aucasaurus the flocculus is enclosed  in  an  8-shaped  floccular  recess,  similar  in  shape and size to that observed in  Abelisaurus, suggesting that the two Patagonian taxa were capable of a slightly wider range of movements of the head. The labyrinth of the inner ear is similar in shape and size to the semicircular canals of Majungasaurus,  although  the  lateral  semicircular  canal  is  shorter in Aucasaurus.

Classification 
Aucasaurus was closely related to Carnotaurus and they are united in the Carnotaurini.

Below is a cladogram by Canalle et al. in 2009.

See also 
 Timeline of ceratosaur research

References 

Brachyrostrans
Campanian life
Santonian life
Late Cretaceous dinosaurs of South America
Cretaceous Argentina
Fossils of Argentina
Anacleto Formation
Fossil taxa described in 2002
Taxa named by Rodolfo Coria
Taxa named by Luis M. Chiappe